Tytti Seppänen (born 1980) is a Finnish Centre Party politician. She was born in Vaala. 

She was Vice-Chair of the Centre Party Youth. Since 2006, she has been Chair of the Nordic Youth and the town's municipality manager.

External links
 Tytti Seppänen nousi UNR:n puheenjohtajaksi 30-10-2006
 Seppäsen vaalisivut

1980 births
Living people
People from Vaala
Centre Party (Finland) politicians
Finnish women in politics
Date of birth missing (living people)